To The Bones are an English four piece rock and roll band from Bolton, England.  The group formed in January 2005 and up to date have released four singles and an album.

Career
To The Bones are a 4 piece rock band from Bolton, England, who were described by the NME as 'White hot slasher grunge'. The band have performed with many bands over the years including shows with The Eighties Matchbox B-Line Disaster, The Eagles of Death Metal, Hell is For Heroes, Oceansize, The Living End, Deerhunter, Pulled Apart by Horses, Dinosaur Pile Up and many more. The band have also played many festivals such Leeds and Reading, Guilfest, Camden Crawl, Offset Festival, The great escape festival and also a performed on a pilot TV show designed by Zane Lowe.

In 2011, original players Wayne Riley and Matt Evans parted with the band, leading the way for current members Chris Yates on guitar and Jude Jagger on bass to join To The Bones. They feature on all recordings from 2012 onwards which includes the single "Emperor's Ride" which was released on 22 April 2013 and was mixed by the British record producer Dave Eringa.

The single "Rex" was recorded with Dave Eringa in 24 hours in Beethoven Street Studios in London. Eringa reportedly recorded the band for free after being so impressed with the song.

In October 2008, the band released their debut album, Duke Type A, on Medici Records. 

In January 2009, the band went into the studio with Sean Genockey to re-record the song "Lips on Red" as a single, which was released in March 2009 on Medici Records.

In 2010 the band teamed up with record producer Sean Genockey to record a 4 track EP called Astral Magic. The EP was recorded at Dean St. Studios in London. The EP was released on the DIY record label 'Evening Economies' on 22 November. Steve Lamacq played the lead single from the EP, "YHF", on the day of its release.

The band's album and single artwork has been specially created by Marvel Comic artist Jackademus

Current band line up
Rhys Gordon Bradley (Vocals, Guitar)
Jude Jagger (Bass guitar, Vocals)
Tom Evans (Drums)
Chris Yates (Guitar)

Discography

Albums
Duke Type A (20 October 2008)
"Astral Magic" (22 November 2010)

Singles

EPs
Beakeriser (October 2005)
The Halo Effect (January 2006)

References

External links
 Official Myspace Page
 Live At Reading Festival BBC
 Guardian Online
 NME Interview

Musical groups from Greater Manchester
Musical quartets
Musicians from the Metropolitan Borough of Bolton
English experimental rock groups
English noise rock groups
English indie rock groups